COV, Cov, CoV or Co-V may refer to:
 Cash-Over-Valuation
 City of Villains, a multiplayer online video game
 Coefficient of variation, a statistical measure
 Covariance, a measure in probability theory and statistics
 Calculus of variations, a field of mathematical analysis
 Abbreviation of Coventry, a city in the United Kingdom
 COV, the ICAO airline designator for Helicentre Coventry, United Kingdom
 Cov, the station code for Coventry railway station
 Coventry R.F.C., often abbreviated to just "Cov"
 Coventry City F.C., which is also sometimes known by the shorter form
 The Amtrak station code for Connellsville station, Pennsylvania, United States
 The LRT station abbreviation for Cove LRT station, Punggol, Singapore
 The NYSE abbreviation for Covidien Ltd, a medical technology and pharmaceutical company
 CoV or Co-V, an abbreviation for Coronavirus
 Cao Miao language (ISO 639 language code: cov)

See also

nCoV (disambiguation)